Ann Christy (born Christianne Leenaerts, 22 September 1945 in Antwerp – 7 August 1984 in Meise) was a Belgian singer who enjoyed success in her native country and is best known internationally for her participation in the Eurovision Song Contest 1975.

Early career 
Christy began a singing career with The Adams Orchestra, whose drummer, Marc Hoyois, she later married. Her first solo recordings met with little success. During this period she toured in Belgium and France with Salvatore Adamo. In 1968 she won the Knokke Cup singing contest.

Eurovision Song Contest 
Christy's first attempt to represent Belgium in the Eurovision Song Contest came in 1970 with the song "Le temps, le vent" ("Time, Wind"), which failed to progress past the semi-final stage. She did better the following year, when "Dag vreemde man" ("Hello Stranger") finished in second place. A third attempt in 1973, when each of five chosen acts performed two songs, ended in third place for "Bye Bye". (Christy's other song, "Meeuwen" ("Seagulls"), was unplaced).

Christy was finally successful in 1975, when "Gelukkig zijn" ("Being Happy") was chosen as Belgium's representative in the twentieth Eurovision Song Contest, which took place on 22 March in Stockholm. Christy sang the first half of the song in Dutch and the second half in English, and although the song had been tipped to do well, it ended the evening in a very disappointing 15th place out of 19 entries.

Later career 
In 1977 Christy played in 152 performances of a musical adaptation of Shakespeare's A Midsummer Night's Dream in the town of Mechelen.

She had a major hit in Belgium in 1980 with "De Roos", a Dutch-language version of Bette Midler's "The Rose". In 2008 this track topped a list of 1,000 classics voted for by the general public in a poll for Belgian radio channel, Radio 2.

Compilations of Christy's work have been issued regularly in Belgium since her death, and recently these have included previously unreleased recordings.

Death 
Christy was diagnosed with cervical cancer in 1982, and died on 7 August 1984, aged 38.

References

1945 births
1984 deaths
Eurovision Song Contest entrants for Belgium
Deaths from cancer in Belgium
Deaths from cervical cancer
Eurovision Song Contest entrants of 1975
Musicians from Antwerp
20th-century Belgian women singers
20th-century Belgian singers
Christy, Ann